I Am They was an American contemporary Christian music band from Carson City, Nevada, formed in 2011. The band consisted of five members and were first signed to Essential Records. Their self-titled debut album was released in 2015. They were most recently signed to Big Future. They announced in a Facebook post that they had played their final show on December 8, 2022

Background
I Am They, a Christian band from Carson City, Nevada was initially formed as a worship ministry called "Solomon's Porch" for what was intended to be a single night worship gathering on October 31, 2008, hosted at Calvary Chapel Carson City. After a positive reception from the local church community, the band continued holding bi-monthly worship gatherings.

After receiving an offer from local Christian concert promoters, Ian Bullis and Jonathan Velasquez, to open for CCM artist Matthew West in January 2009, the band began to write original material and formally changed their name to I Am They in order to differentiate it from the bi-monthly worship ministry they hosted.

The band signed to Provident Label Group in the summer of 2013 and went into the studio in January 2014 to record their self-titled debut at Yackland Studios in Nashville, TN with Producer Jonathan Smith and Executive Producer Jason Ingram.  Their debut album released on January 27, 2015.

In winter and spring of 2015, the band was a part of the national touring "Rock & Worship Roadshow" alongside MercyMe, Crowder, and Group 1 Crew, followed by a tour with Matt Maher on the spring leg of the Saints & Sinners tour.

In August 2015, I Am They received a Dove Award nomination for New Artist of the Year.

In March 2016, Abbie Parker replaced Stephanie Kulla as the lead female vocalist for the band. On the same day, the band released a new single "Make A Way" featuring Abbie Parker. I Am They released the 4-song worship EP The Resting Place - EP in June 2016.

In April 2017, a new vocalist, Houston resident Jon McConnell, was introduced with the release of the band's new song, Crown Him.

In early 2019, a new drummer/percussionist, Nicole Hickman, joined the group, allowing Sara Palmer to focus on planning and promotion full-time.  Nicole had spent a number of years touring with Holly Starr.   

In January 2022, the band announced that they had signed with Big Future Music Group in a joint venture with Truss Records. The announcement also pictured and listed Cheyenne Mitchell as vocalist, in place of previous lead female vocalist Abbie Parker.

Members
Current members
 Matthew Hein – vocals, guitar, banjo, dobro, mandolin
 Cheyenne Mitchell (since January 2022)
 Justin Shinn – keys, organ, concert drum, banjo, mandolin, bass
 Nicole Hickman (2019–present)– drums, percussion
 Brandon Chase (August 2019–present) – vocals, guitar, banjo
Former members
 Stephanie Kulla (2015) – vocals
 Bobby Stiehler – bass, percussion
 Raul Aguilar Jr. – bass
 Adam Palmer (2015-2019) – vocals, guitar, Nashville high-strung guitar, banjo, dobro, concert drum
 Sara Palmer (2015-2019) – drums, percussion
 Jon McConnell (until late 2019) – vocals, guitar, keys
 Abbie Parker (2016–2021) – vocals, harmonium, keys

Discography

Albums

Extended plays

Singles

Promotional singles
Separate from their standard singles released to radio, the band has released numerous worship songs with session music videos. They have typically been covers, but not exclusively.

References

External links

American Christian rock groups
Musical groups from Nevada
Essential Records (Christian) artists